The 1989 NASCAR Busch Series began February 18 and ended October 29. Rob Moroso of Moroso Racing won the championship.

Races

Goody's 300 

The Goody's 300 was held on February 18 at Daytona International Speedway. Kenny Wallace won the pole.

Top Ten Results

 17-Darrell Waltrip
 72-Rusty Wallace
 25-Rob Moroso
  3-Dale Earnhardt
 15-Geoff Bodine
 75-Rick Wilson
 11-Jack Ingram
 30-Michael Waltrip
 52-Ken Schrader
 36-Kenny Wallace

 Donnie Allison made his last ever start in any NASCAR series. He crashed out after completing 7 laps, finishing 37th.

Goodwrench 200 

The Goodwrench 200 was held March 4 at North Carolina Motor Speedway. Rob Moroso won the pole.

Top Ten Results

 25-Rob Moroso
  3-Dale Earnhardt
 99-Tommy Ellis
 44-Bobby Labonte
  6-Tommy Houston 1 lap down
  2-L. D. Ottinger 1 lap down
 11-Jack Ingram 1 lap down
 34-Jimmy Spencer 1 lap down
 56-Ronald Cooper 1 lap down
 86-Dana Patten 1 lap down

Miller Classic 

The Miller Classic was a 200 lap race held March 10 at Martinsville Speedway. The No. 25 of Rob Moroso won the pole.

Top Ten Results

 99-Tommy Ellis
  6-Tommy Houston
 42-Elton Sawyer
  4-Max Prestwood
 49-Ed Ferree
 34-Jimmy Spencer 1 lap down
 36-Kenny Wallace 1 lap down
 63-Chuck Bown 1 lap down
  1-Mark Martin 1 lap down
 12-Jeff Burton 1 lap down

Mountain Dew 400 

The Mountain Dew 400 was held March 25 at Hickory Motor Speedway. Dale Jarrett won the pole.

Top Ten Results

 34-Jimmy Spencer*
 99-Tommy Ellis
 25-Rob Moroso
 11-Jack Ingram
 32-Dale Jarrett* 1 lap down
  7-Harry Gant 1 lap down
 22-Rick Mast 1 lap down
 36-Kenny Wallace 1 lap down
 24-Joe Thurman 1 lap down
  3-Dale Earnhardt 2 laps down

 Jimmy Spencer spun out Dale Jarrett in turn 3 with 2 laps to go in order to win the race. Fines were handed out to both Spencer and Jarrett for inappropriate actions afterwards by NASCAR.

Country Squire 200 

The Country Squire 200 was held April 1 at Darlington Raceway. Geoff Bodine won the pole.

Top Ten Results

 15-Geoff Bodine
  1-Mark Martin
  7-Harry Gant
 55-Phil Parsons
 75-Rick Wilson
  3-Dale Earnhardt
 28-Davey Allison
 52-Ken Schrader
 25-Rob Moroso 1 lap down
 56-Ronald Cooper 1 lap down

Budweiser 200 

The Budweiser 200 was held April 10 at Bristol Motor Speedway. Rick Wilson won the pole.

Top Ten Results

 75-Rick Wilson
  1-Mark Martin
 22-Rick Mast
  9-Steve Grissom
 36-Kenny Wallace
 25-Rob Moroso 1 lap down
  2-L. D. Ottinger 1 lap down
 30-Michael Waltrip 2 laps down
 34-Jimmy Spencer 2 laps down
  6-Tommy Houston 2 laps down

GM Parts 300 

The GM Parts 300 was held April 30 at Nazareth Speedway. The No. 6 of Tommy Houston won the pole.

Top Ten Results

 81-Bobby Hillin Jr.
 99-Tommy Ellis
 30-Michael Waltrip
 86-Tom Peck
 28-Davey Allison
 52-Ken Schrader 1 lap down
 79-Dave Rezendes 3 laps down
 11-Jack Ingram 5 laps down
 34-Jimmy Spencer 6 laps down
 60-Dale Shaw 11 laps down

Busch 200 

The Busch 200 was held May 6 at South Boston Speedway. Rob Moroso won the pole.

Top Ten Results

 99-Tommy Ellis
 11-Jack Ingram
  6-Tommy Houston
 25-Rob Moroso
 22-Rick Mast
 36-Kenny Wallace
 56-Ronald Cooper
 63-Chuck Bown 1 lap down
 30-Ronnie Silver 1 lap down
 32-Robert Powell 1 lap down

Big Star/Nestle 200 

The Big Star/Nestle 200 was held May 13 at Lanier Raceway. The No. 63 of Chuck Bown won the pole.

Top Ten Results

 56-Ronald Cooper
 25-Rob Moroso
  6-Tommy Houston
 32-Robert Powell
 11-Jack Ingram
 99-Tommy Ellis
 22-Rick Mast
 47-Billy Standridge
 12-Jeff Burton 1 lap down
 81-Bobby Hillin Jr. 1 lap down

 This was the only victory Ronald Cooper took in the NASCAR Busch Series.

Granger Select 200 

The Granger Select 200 was held May 20 at Nashville Speedway USA. Kenny Wallace won the pole.

Top Ten Results

 22-Rick Mast
  8-Bobby Hamilton
 36-Kenny Wallace
 11-Jack Ingram 1 lap down
 56-Ronald Cooper 1 lap down
 30-Ronnie Silver 1 lap down
 99-Tommy Ellis 2 laps down
 63-Chuck Bown 2 laps down
 34-Jimmy Spencer 2 laps down
  2-L. D. Ottinger 3 laps down

Champion 300 

The Champion 300 was held May 27 at Charlotte Motor Speedway. The No. 87 of Greg Sacks won the pole.

Top Ten Results

 25-Rob Moroso
 17-Darrell Waltrip
 30-Michael Waltrip
 33-Brad Teague
 22-Rick Mast
 32-Dale Jarrett
  6-Tommy Houston
 11-Jack Ingram
 72-Rusty Wallace
 15-Geoff Bodine

Budweiser 200 

The Budweiser 200 was held June 3 at Dover International Speedway. The No. 7 of Harry Gant won the pole.

Top Ten Results

 75-Rick Wilson
 55-Phil Parsons
 87-Dale Earnhardt
  1-Mark Martin
 99-Tommy Ellis
 63-Chuck Bown
 36-Kenny Wallace
 52-Ken Schrader
 86-Dana Patten
 71-Randy LaJoie 1 lap down
This would be Henderson Motorsports' last NASCAR win until 2017.

Roses Stores 200 

The Roses Stores 200 was held June 10 at Orange County Speedway. Jimmy Spencer won the pole.

Top Ten Results

 34-Jimmy Spencer*
  6-Tommy Houston 1 lap down
 22-Rick Mast 1 lap down
 36-Kenny Wallace 1 lap down
 30-Ronnie Silver 1 lap down
 42-Elton Sawyer 1 lap down
 81-Kyle Petty 2 laps down
 12-Jeff Burton 3 laps down
 59-Robert Pressley 3 laps down
 56-Ronald Cooper 5 laps down

 Jimmy Spencer lapped the entire field in this race.

Granger Select 200 

The Granger Select 200 was held June 24 at Louisville Motor Speedway. Kenny Wallace won the pole.

Top Ten Results

  6-Tommy Houston
 30-Michael Waltrip
 42-Elton Sawyer
  2-L. D. Ottinger
 63-Chuck Bown
 02-Kenny Burks
 36-Kenny Wallace
 96-Tom Peck
 25-Rob Moroso 1 lap down
  9-Steve Grissom 1 lap down

Firecracker 200 

The Firecracker 200 was held July 1 at Volusia County Speedway in Barberville, Florida. Rob Moroso won the pole.

Top Ten Results

 25-Rob Moroso
 99-Tommy Ellis
 63-Chuck Bown
  2-L. D. Ottinger
 11-Jack Ingram
 56-Ronald Cooper
 22-Rick Mast
 36-Kenny Wallace
 30-Ronnie Silver
 79-Dave Rezendes

Carolina Pride/Budweiser 200 

The Carolina Pride/Budweiser 200 was held July 4 at Myrtle Beach Speedway. The No. 22 of Rick Mast won the pole.

Top Ten Results

 34-Jimmy Spencer
 11-Jack Ingram
  8-Bobby Hamilton
 12-Jeff Burton
 42-Elton Sawyer
 02-Kenny Burks
 25-Rob Moroso
 32-Robert Powell
 99-Tommy Ellis
 96-Tom Peck −1 lap

Coors 200 

The Coors 200 was held July 15 at South Boston Speedway. Chuck Bown won the pole.

Top Ten Results

  6-Tommy Houston
 99-Tommy Ellis
 63-Chuck Bown
  2-L. D. Ottinger
 25-Rob Moroso
 90-Larry Pearson
 70-Jimmy Hensley
 56-Ronald Cooper
 36-Kenny Wallace
 24-Joe Thurman

Pepsi 200 

The Pepsi 200 was held July 22 at Hickory Motor Speedway. Jimmy Hensley won the pole.

Top Ten Results

 99-Tommy Ellis
 34-Randy LaJoie*
 11-Jack Ingram
 22-Rick Mast
  6-Tommy Houston
 70-Jimmy Hensley 1 lap down
 41-Max Prestwood 1 lap down
  2-L. D. Ottinger 1 lap down
 36-Kenny Wallace 1 lap down
 32-Robert Powell 2 laps down

 Randy LaJoie replaced Jimmy Spencer, who had been released.

Old Milwaukee 200 

The Old Milwaukee 200 was held July 29 at New River Valley Speedway in Dublin, Virginia. The No. 25 of Rob Moroso won the pole.

Top Ten Results

 22-Rick Mast
 63-Chuck Bown
  9-Steve Grissom
 02-Kenny Burks
  2-L. D. Ottinger
  8-Bobby Hamilton
  6-Tommy Houston
 11-Jack Ingram
 36-Kenny Wallace 1 lap down
 59-Robert Pressley 1 lap down

Kroger 200 

The Kroger 200 was held August 5 at Indianapolis Raceway Park. Michael Waltrip won the pole.

Top Ten Results

 30-Michael Waltrip
  1-Mark Martin
  6-Tommy Houston
 86-Dana Patten
  3-Dale Earnhardt
  9-Steve Grissom
  2-L. D. Ottinger 1 lap down
 63-Chuck Bown 1 lap down
 96-Tom Peck 1 lap down
 90-Morgan Shepherd 1 lap down

Texas Pete 200 

The Texas Pete 200 was held August 12 at Orange County Speedway in Rougemont, North Carolina. The No. 25 of Rob Moroso won the pole.

Top Ten Results

 59-Robert Pressley*
  6-Tommy Houston
 99-Tommy Ellis
 22-Rick Mast
 30-Ronnie Silver
  2-L. D. Ottinger
 12-Jeff Burton 1 lap down
 14-Wayne Patterson 1 lap down
 96-Tom Peck 1 lap down
 90-Davey Johnson 1 lap down

 This was Robert Pressley's first career Busch Grand National victory.

Jay Johnson 200 

The Jay Johnson 200 was held August 25 at Bristol Motor Speedway. The No. 90 of Morgan Shepherd won the pole.

Top Ten Results

  1-Mark Martin
  2-L. D. Ottinger
 22-Rick Mast
 32-Dale Jarrett
  3-Dale Earnhardt
 87-Jimmy Spencer
 02-Kenny Burks 1 lap down
 99-Tommy Ellis 2 laps down
 36-Kenny Wallace 2 laps down
  6-Tommy Houston 2 laps down

Gatorade 200 

The Gatorade 200 was held September 2 at Darlington Raceway. The No. 15 of Ken Schrader won the pole.

Top Ten Results

  7-Harry Gant
 55-Phil Parsons
 01-Jack Pennington
  3-Dale Earnhardt
 96-Tom Peck
 99-Tommy Ellis
 44-Bobby Labonte
  2-L. D. Ottinger
  4-Ed Berrier
 92-Jimmy Means

Commonwealth 200 

The Commonwealth 200 was held September 9 at Richmond International Raceway. Tommy Ellis won the pole.

Top Ten Results

  8-Bobby Hamilton
 99-Tommy Ellis
 36-Kenny Wallace
 25-Rob Moroso
  3-Dale Earnhardt
 11-Jack Ingram
  6-Tommy Houston
  1-Mark Martin 1 lap down
  2-L. D. Ottinger 1 lap down
 81-Bobby Hillin Jr. 1 lap down

Ames/Peak 200 

The Ames/Peak 200 was held September 16 at Dover International Speedway. The No. 30 of Michael Waltrip won the pole.

Top Ten Results

 52-Ken Schrader
  1-Mark Martin
 56-Ronald Cooper
 82-Kyle Petty
 17-Darrell Waltrip 1 lap down
 63-Chuck Bown 1 lap down
 22-Rick Mast 1 lap down
  2-L. D. Ottinger 1 lap down
 96-Tom Peck 1 lap down
 86-Dana Patten 2 laps down

Zerex 150 

The Zerex 150 was held September 23 at Martinsville Speedway. Rob Moroso won the pole.

Top Ten Results

  6-Tommy Houston
 25-Rob Moroso
 12-Jeff Burton
 56-Ronald Cooper
  2-L. D. Ottinger
 47-Billy Standridge
 79-Dave Rezendes
 63-Chuck Bown
 75-Butch Miller 1 lap down
 87-Jimmy Spencer 1 lap down

All Pro 300 

The All Pro 300 was held October 7 at Charlotte Motor Speedway. Michael Waltrip won the pole.

Top Ten Results

 25-Rob Moroso*
 30-Michael Waltrip
 32-Dale Jarrett
 01-Jack Pennington
 87-Jimmy Spencer
 44-Bobby Labonte
  7-Harry Gant
 36-Kenny Wallace 1 lap down
  9-Steve Grissom 1 lap down
 55-Phil Parsons 2 laps down

 This was Rob Moroso's 3rd consecutive Busch Grand National victory at Charlotte Motor Speedway.

AC-Delco 200 

The AC-Delco 200 was held October 21 at North Carolina Motor Speedway. The No. 1 of Mark Martin won the pole.

Top Ten Results

  7-Harry Gant
 55-Phil Parsons
  8-Bobby Hamilton
 17-Darrell Waltrip
  6-Tommy Houston
 81-Bobby Hillin Jr.
  3-Michael Waltrip
 34-Randy LaJoie
 52-Ken Schrader
 99-Tommy Ellis 1 lap down

Winston Classic 

The Winston Classic was a 200 lap race held October 29 at Martinsville Speedway. The No. 22 of Rick Mast won the pole.

Top Ten Results

  2-L. D. Ottinger
  7-Harry Gant
 25-Rob Moroso
  1-Geoff Bodine
 63-Chuck Bown
 77-Morgan Shepherd
 11-Jack Ingram
  8-Bobby Hamilton
 08-Bobby Dotter
 99-Tommy Ellis

Final points standings 

 25-Rob Moroso – 4001
  6-Tommy Houston – 3946
 99-Tommy Ellis – 3945
  2-L. D. Ottinger – 3916
 11-Jack Ingram – 3802
 36-Kenny Wallace – 3750
 22-Rick Mast – 3558
 56-Ronald Cooper – 3554
 63-Chuck Bown – 3349
86/96-Tom Peck – 3171
  8-Bobby Hamilton – 3133
  9-Steve Grissom – 3108
 12-Jeff Burton – 2967
 47-Billy Standridge – 2843
34/87-Jimmy Spencer – 2704
 79-Dave Rezendes – 2635
 24-Joe Thurman – 2575
70/42-Elton Sawyer – 2202
 59-Robert Pressley – 2129
  7-Harry Gant – 1907
  1-Mark Martin – 1832
 70-Jimmy Hensley – 1785
30/3-Michael Waltrip – 1716
 02-Kenny Burks – 1682
3/87-Dale Earnhardt – 1637
71/34-Randy LaJoie – 1542
 81-Bobby Hillin Jr. – 1360
4/41-Max Prestwood – 1354
 75-Rick Wilson – 1273
Brandon Baker – 1172
 30-Ronnie Silver – 1155
52/15-Ken Schrader – 1108
 55-Phil Parsons – 1098
 32-Dale Jarrett – 1049
 45-Patty Moise – 1023
 17-Darrell Waltrip – 985
Ed Berrier – 961
 28-Davey Allison – 954
 86-Dana Patten – 893
32/5-Robert Powell – 785
 44-Bobby Labonte – 757
 62-John Linville – 691
 41-Jamie Aube – 646
 14-Wayne Patterson – 621
 Joe Bessey – 573
 66-Donny Ling Jr. – 562
 01-Jack Pennington – 553
 33-Brad Teague – 549
  5-Jay Fogleman – 536
 85-Bobby Moon – 527

Rookie of the Year 
Kenny Wallace won the first Busch Series Rookie of the Year Award ever given, posting sixteen top-ten finishes and winning three poles. Bobby Hamilton and Jeff Burton, both of whom would later go on to win the award in Winston Cup, finished second and third in the standings, respectively. Dave Rezendes, Robert Pressley, and Brandon Baker were the only other full-time contenders, as Dave Simpson, Ed Ferree, and Tom Harrington only ran a limited schedule

Additional Information 
On September 30, 1990, less than 1 year after becoming champion, Rob Moroso was killed in an automobile crash near Mooresville, North Carolina, only hours after finishing 21st in the NASCAR Winston Cup Holly Farms 400 at North Wilkesboro Speedway. Traveling at estimated , Moroso lost control of his vehicle on a curve with a  posted speed limit. The resulting collision killed both Moroso and Tammy Williams, the driver of the vehicle in the opposite lane.  The curve in which Moroso was killed is now called Dead Mans Curve, by the townspeople of Mooresville, NC.

Investigations revealed that he had been driving under the influence of alcohol. His blood alcohol level was 0.22, over twice the then legal level of 0.10. He also had been convicted of speeding four times. Judges could have revoked his license at least twice but the charges were reduced.

Moroso earned enough points after completing just 25 of 29 NASCAR Winston Cup races that he was posthumously awarded the Raybestos NASCAR Rookie of the Year Award in 1990.

See also
1989 NASCAR Winston Cup Series

References

External links 
Busch Series Standings and Statistics for 1989

NASCAR Xfinity Series seasons